Brianne Banigan Leary (born July 28, 1957) is an American actress and inventor. She co-hosted the Disney Channel's second season of Walt Disney World Inside Out with George Foreman and J.D. Roth. She also hosted Animal Planet's Petsburgh USA.

Family and career
Leary's mother was the Assistant City Editor for the Arizona Daily Star, and she is a cousin of writer Timothy Leary.

During high school at Canyon Del Oro in Tucson, Arizona, Leary was a gymnastics champion, finishing in the top three at the State Championship in 1974.

Leary first appeared on television as a contestant on Match Game '76. She won several games over the four episodes in which she appeared, earning a total of $9,050. She came back to the show three years later as a celebrity panelist, becoming the only person to appear on the 1970s incarnation as both a contestant and a panelist (1979 contestant Kirstie Alley is coming back to the re-booted show as a panelist in 2019).

Leary's first acting role came as nurse Susan Ames in the series Baa Baa Black Sheep (1977–1978). She later had a recurring role as Officer Sindy Cahill in the second season of CHiPs (1978–1979), before guest appearing in various shows, including Buck Rogers in the 25th Century; The Fall Guy; Simon & Simon; No Soap, Radio; Russian gymnast Tania in The Paper Chase episode "A Case of Detente" in 1979; and 1st & Ten. She also made an appearance in a Battle of the Network Star V ' in November 1978 and Battle of the Network Stars VI in May 1979.

In 1996 until 1998, Leary created a Canadian animated children's TV show, Stickin' Around, with Robin Steele, who worked on MTV's Stick Figure Theatre.

In 2007, Leary received a patent for her "portable device for cleaning an animal's paw", calling "Paw Plunger".

Partial filmographyBaa Baa Black Sheep (1977–1978, TV Series) - Lt. Susan AmesCHiPs (1978–1979, TV Series) - Officer Sindy CahillOff the Wall (1983) - JennyWalt Disney World Inside Out (1996-1997) - Co-hostPetsburgh USA'' (1998-1999) - Host

References

External links

American television actresses
Contestants on American game shows
Living people
1957 births
Actors from Providence, Rhode Island
Actresses from Rhode Island
21st-century American women